Feng Shaofeng (born October 7, 1978), also known as William Feng, is a Chinese actor. Feng rose to fame with the hit time travel series Palace (2011). He was ranked 33rd on 2012's Forbes China Celebrity 100 list. He won the Hundred Flowers Award for Best Actor for his role in the film Wolf Totem (2015). Feng is also known for his roles as Yuchi Zhenjin in Tsui Hark's Detective Dee series and Tang Sanzang in Cheang Pou-soi's The Monkey King films.

Feng featured and ranked 33rd on Forbes China Celebrity 100 list in 2013, 98th in 2015, 89th in 2017, and 88th in 2019.

Early life and education
Feng Shaofeng was born in Shanghai as the only child.  His father is a civil servant.  Strongly influenced by his artistic mother, Feng began taking violin lessons and participating in various extracurricular activities when he was a child. Upon graduating from high school, he applied to the Shanghai Theater Academy and was accepted with scholarship.

Career

Beginnings
Feng made his acting debut in 1998, and has appeared in several television series, including Boy & Girl, Wind and Cloud 2, Assassinator Jing Ke, Sigh of His Highness, and The Conquest.

Feng gained more attention after starring in a grand production drama by Hong Kong's TVB and mainland China's CCTV, The Drive of Life. He then starred in the period drama Yun Niang alongside Ady An and Leanne Liu, which placed number one in ratings upon its premiere on SMG. Feng reunited with Ady An in Four Women Conflicts, and his performance in the series won him the Audience's Most Favorite Actor award at Fujian TV Station's "I Love My Drama" award ceremony. In 2010, he played the role of Liu Zhang in Beauty's Rival in Palace.

Rise in popularity
Feng rose to mainstream popularity after starring in Palace (2011), one of the most popular Chinese dramas of the year. The same year, he starred in Daniel Lee's historical film White Vengeance where plays Xiang Yu, the powerful warlord. Feng's outstanding performance in the film led to him winning two awards - "Most Commercially Valuable Newcomer" and "Outstanding Performance" at the 2011 Harbin Film Festival.

Feng then starred in Painted Skin: The Resurrection (2012), a sequel to Gordon Chan's 2008 box office hit Painted Skin. He next starred alongside Fan Bingbing in Double Xposure, a romantic thriller directed by Li Yu.

In 2013, Feng starred as the titular prince in the historical drama Prince of Lan Ling. The series earned high ratings in Taiwan, breaking the record set by Three Kingdoms, and earned increased recognition for Feng in the region. The same year, he starred in the action film Young Detective Dee: Rise of the Sea Dragon directed by Tsui Hark. Feng was voted the Most Popular Actor award at the 2014 Beijing Student Film Festival.

Success in films and TV productions
In 2014, Feng starred alongside Tang Wei in The Golden Era directed by Ann Hui, which closed at the Venice International Film Festival. His portrayal of Xiao Jun, a left-wing author who is strong and not afraid to express his feelings, earned the praises of the director. Feng had requested not to be paid to support Ann, whom he has admired and wanted to work with her for many years. The same year, he starred in the road-trip comedy The Continent, directed by Han Han.

In 2015, Feng starred in the Chinese-French co-production Wolf Totem, adapted from Jiang Rong’s 2004 best-selling novel by the same name. He plays a Chinese student who is sent to Inner Mongolia to teach shepherds and instead learns about the wolf population. Feng and co-star Shawn Dou bonded with the wolves by cleaning their cages and feeding them; and trained in horse-riding for their roles. The film earned Feng his first Best Actor trophy at the 33rd Hundred Flowers Awards. The same year, he was cast in the film adaptation of the best-selling novel, The Three-Body Problem.

Feng then played Xuanzang in The Monkey King 2, which was released in February 2016. The same year, he starred alongside Victoria Song in fantasy drama  Ice Fantasy, adapted from Guo Jingming's novel of the same name as well as the Chinese remake of My Best Friend's Wedding.

Feng returned to television with another fantasy drama The Starry Night, The Starry Sea (2017) alongside Bea Hayden. The same year, he starred alongside Liu Yifei in the fantasy comedy film Hanson and the Beast. He was also cast as the male lead in historical drama The Story of Minglan.

In 2018, Feng reprised his roles as Tang Sanzang and Yuchi in the films The Monkey King 3 and Detective Dee: The Four Heavenly Kings respectively. The same year, he was cast in the wuxia film Song of the Assassins. He is set to return to the television with historical drama, The Imperial Age, portraying Yongle Emperor.

Personal life
On October 16, 2018, Feng announced his marriage to actress Zhao Liying. On March 8, 2019, he announced on Sina Weibo that his wife Zhao Liying had given birth to a boy.

On April 23, 2021 Feng and Zhao announced their divorce.

Filmography

Film

Television series

Discography

Awards and nominations

References

External links
 

1978 births
Living people
Male actors from Shanghai
Shanghai Theatre Academy alumni
Chinese male television actors
Chinese male film actors
21st-century Chinese male actors